The Times They Are a-Changin may refer to:

"The Times They Are a-Changin (song), a 1964 song by Bob Dylan
The Times They Are a-Changin' (Bob Dylan album), the 1964 Bob Dylan album (of which the song is the title track)
The Times They Are A-Changin' (Burl Ives album), 1968
[[The Times They Are a-Changin' (musical)|The Times They Are a-Changin''' (musical)]], a 2006 musical featuring the songs of Bob Dylan
The Times They Are a Changing (The Fureys album), 2014The Times They Are a-Changin'', a 1966 EP by The Byrds

Quotations from music
1964 neologisms
Bob Dylan